Marshall Shirk (born August 3, 1940) was a Canadian football player who played for the Ottawa Rough Riders. He won the Grey Cup in 1968 and 1969. He previously played college football at the University of California, Los Angeles.

References

1940 births
Living people
American football defensive tackles
Canadian football defensive linemen
UCLA Bruins football players
Ottawa Rough Riders players
Sportspeople from Los Angeles County, California
Players of American football from California
American players of Canadian football